Dominik Kružliak (born 10 July 1996) is a Slovak football player who currently plays for Fortuna Liga club DAC Dunajská Streda as a defender.

Career

MFK Ružomberok
He made his Fortuna Liga debut for Ružomberok against ViOn Zlaté Moravce on 29 March 2014, entering in as a substitute in place of injured Lukáš Greššák in the 59th minute of the match. ViOn however went on to defeat Ružomberok 1:0.

International career
Kružliak was first called up for Slovakia national team for two unofficial friendly fixtures in January 2017, in Abu Dhabi, UAE, against Uganda (1–3 loss) and Sweden. He made his debut on 12 January against Sweden, however he only played the first half of the match. Slovakia lost the game 0–6.

References

External links
 
 Futbalnet profile 
 MFK Ružomberok profile 
 Eurofotbal profile 
 

1996 births
Living people
Sportspeople from Liptovský Mikuláš
Slovak footballers
Slovakia youth international footballers
Slovakia under-21 international footballers
Association football defenders
MFK Ružomberok players
FC DAC 1904 Dunajská Streda players
Slovak Super Liga players